Derley may refer to:
Wanderley de Jesus Sousa (born 1986), Brazilian footballer
Derley (footballer, born 1987), Brazilian footballer

See also
Derlei (born 1975), Brazilian footballer